WKFI (1090 AM) is a commercial radio station licensed to Wilmington, Ohio, and serving the eastern suburbs of the Dayton metropolitan area.  The station is owned by Town And Country Broadcasting, Inc.  It is simulcast with co-owned WBZI 1500 AM in Xenia, broadcasting a classic country radio format, known as "Real Roots Radio."  News updates are provided by Fox News Radio and the Ohio News Network.

By day, WKFI is powered at 1,000 watts using a non-directional antenna.  But because 1090 AM is a clear channel frequency reserved for Class A KAAY Little Rock, WBAL Baltimore and XEPRS Tijuana Mexico, WKFI must sign off at night to avoid interference.  Programming is also heard on FM translator W294CQ at 106.7 MHz.

Brief history
On December 5, 1964, the station signed on as WMWM.  In 1974, it switched its call sign to WKFI. Several formats over the years included Middle of the Road, Country music with farm news and later Southern Gospel.  

In 1968, an FM station was added as WKIT at 102.3 MHz.  At first, the two stations simulcast their programming.  Then briefly it took the WKFI call letters until the early 1970s when the call sign changed to WDHK with an adult contemporary format. That format remained throughout the 1970s and 1980s when the call sign was  switched to WSWO-FM in 1982 and then playing new country in 1997. It became classic country in 2003 as a brief AM/FM simulcast of WBZI until WSWO-FM was sold to EMF Broadcasting becoming WKLN, the southwest Ohio repeater of K-LOVE, a national Christian Contemporary format.

On March 23, 2018, WKFI rebranded as "Real Roots Radio".

WKFI retains the simulcast of WBZI to this day.

See also
WBZI
WEDI

References

External links

FCC History Cards for WKFI

KFI
Clinton County, Ohio
Radio stations established in 1964
Classic country radio stations in the United States
1964 establishments in Ohio
KFI